The 1933 Green Bay Packers season was their 15th season overall and their 13th season in the National Football League (NFL). This was the first year of divisional play and Green Bay competed in the Western Division. The team finished with a 5–7–1 record under coach Curly Lambeau, the first losing season in team history. Beginning this season, the Packers began playing some home game in Milwaukee, Wisconsin, at Borchert Field to draw additional revenue, starting October 1, 1933, against the New York Giants.

The Packers' 7–14 loss on September 23, 1933, to the Chicago Bears would give the Bears the edge in the all-time series between the two teams, and edge that the Bears would hold for over 84 years. The Packers would once again reclaim the all-time series lead against the Bears after a 35–14 victory in Lambeau Field on September 28, 2017.

Schedule

Week 1: vs. Boston Redskins

at East Stadium, Green Bay, Wisconsin
 Date: September 17, 1933
 Attendance: 5,000

Scoring summary

Week 2: vs. Chicago Bears

at East Stadium, Green Bay, Wisconsin
 Date: September 24, 1933
 Attendance: 10,000

Scoring summary

Week 3: vs. New York Giants

at Borchert Field, Milwaukee, Wisconsin
 Date: October 1, 1933
 Attendance: 12,467

Scoring summary

Week 4: vs. Portsmouth Spartans

at East Stadium, Green Bay, Wisconsin
 Date: October 8, 1933
 Attendance: 5,200

Scoring summary

Week 5: vs. Pittsburgh Pirates

at East Stadium, Green Bay, Wisconsin
 Date: October 15, 1933
 Attendance: 4,000

Scoring summary

Week 6: at Chicago Bears

at Wrigley Field, Chicago
 Date: October 22, 1933
 Attendance: 19,000

Scoring summary

Week 7: vs. Philadelphia Eagles

at East Stadium, Green Bay, Wisconsin
 Date: October 29, 1933
 Attendance: 3,007

Scoring summary

Week 8: at Chicago Cardinals

at Wrigley Field, Chicago, Illinois
 Date: November 5, 1933
 Attendance: 5,000

Scoring summary

Week 9: at Portsmouth Spartans

at Universal Stadium, Portsmouth, Ohio
 Date: November 12, 1933
 Attendance: 7,500

Scoring summary

Week 10: at Boston Redskins

at Fenway Park, Boston, Massachusetts
 Date: November 19, 1933
 Attendance: 16,399

Scoring summary

Week 11: at New York Giants

at Polo Grounds, Manhattan, New York
 Date: November 26, 1933
 Attendance: 17,000

Scoring summary

Week 12: at Philadelphia Eagles

at Baker Bowl, Philadelphia
 Date: December 3, 1933
 Attendance: 9,500

Scoring summary

Week 13: at Chicago Bears

at Wrigley Field, Chicago, Illinois
 Date: December 10, 1933
 Attendance: 7,000

Scoring summary

Standings

References

Green Bay Packers seasons
Green Bay Packers
Green Bay Packers